David Bennun (born 1968) is an English writer, journalist and music critic.

Career 
Bennun started his career in music journalism in the 1990s. Notable publications he has written for include Melody Maker, The Guardian and The Quietus. He is noted for his interview pieces, which have been cited in several books.

In 2018, he began to write about political subjects such as Brexit and anti-Semitism for The Guardian and New Statesman.

Publications

Books

Selected interviews 
 Chris Rock  
 Robert J. White

References

External links 
 

1968 births
British music critics
British writers
Living people